Bilal Anwar (born 16 July 1995) is a Pakistani cricketer. He made his first-class debut for Lahore Whites in the 2018–19 Quaid-e-Azam Trophy on 8 September 2018. He made his List A debut for Lahore Whites in the 2018–19 Quaid-e-Azam One Day Cup on 13 September 2018.

References

External links
 

1995 births
Living people
Pakistani cricketers
Lahore Whites cricketers